Quy Đạt (: Thị trấn Quy Đạt)  is a township and town in Minh Hóa District, Quảng Bình Province, North Central Coast, Vietnam. The township is the district seat and located on a mountainous area about 60 km north-west of the provincial capital Đồng Hới City. The township is the commercial and service center serving surrounding rural mountainous areas. Economic activities include: commerce, administrative service. Quy Đạt is crossed by National Route 12.

Communes of Quảng Bình province
Populated places in Quảng Bình province
District capitals in Vietnam
Townships in Vietnam